The 1947 Missouri Valley Vikings football team was an American football team that represented Missouri Valley College as a member of the Missouri College Athletic Union (MCAU) during the 1947 college football season. In their eighth season under head coach Volney Ashford, the Vikings compiled a perfect 12–0 record (4–0 against MCAU teams), won the MCAU championship and two bowl games, and outscored all opponents by a total of 372 to 98.

The season was part of a 41-game winning streak (1941–1942, 1946–1948) that still ranks as the fifth longest in college football history. Coach Ashford, who led the team during the streak, was later inducted into the College Football Hall of Fame.

Schedule

Notes

References

Missouri Valley
Missouri Valley Vikings football seasons
College football undefeated seasons
Missouri Valley Vikings football